Burglauer is a municipality in the district of Rhön-Grabfeld in Bavaria, Germany. It lies on the river Lauer.

Its history as a municipality dates back to 1818. As of 2016-12-31, it had a population of 1,664.

References

External links

Rhön-Grabfeld
1818 establishments in Germany